Grand Coulee may refer to:
Grand Coulee, an ancient river bed in Washington, United States
Grand Coulee Dam, the largest hydroelectric generating facility in the United States
"Grand Coulee Dam" (song), an American folk song by Woody Guthrie
Grand Coulee, Saskatchewan, a town in Saskatchewan, Canada
Grand Coulee, Washington, a city in Grant County, Washington, United States